Galegos is a Portuguese Freguesia in the Municipality of Póvoa de Lanhoso, with an area of 2.50 km² and 543 inhabitants (2011).

Population

References 

Freguesias of Póvoa de Lanhoso